Jetalvasana is a village of Visnagar Taluka in Mehsana district in the Indian state of Gujarat with a population in 2011 of 3311 persons.

References

Villages in Mehsana district